Kimble County is a county located on the Edwards Plateau in the U.S. state of Texas. As of the 2020 census, its population was 4,286. Its county seat is Junction. The county was created in 1858 and organized in 1876. It is named for George C. Kimble, who died at the Battle of the Alamo.

History

Early years
Prior to the arrival of foreign settlers, the area that later became Kimble County was inhabited by several Native American groups, including the Comanche, Kiowa, Kiowa Apache, and Lipan Apache. The first Europeans to encounter the area were the Spanish, who led several campaigns against the local Indian tribes in the mid-18th century. In 1808, Spanish Captain Francisco Amangual commanded a military expedition from San Antonio to Santa Fe and mapped a road, which passed through what is now Kimble County. The area was first mentioned in Republic of Texas documents in 1842, when about 416,000 acres of the present county were included in the Fisher–Miller Land Grant, which extended from the Llano River to the Colorado River.

Settlement and formation
The earliest settlers began arriving in the late 1850s. One of the first was Raleigh Gentry, who settled along Bear Creek around 1857. The Gentry family consisted of Raleigh, his wife, and their several adult sons. Another early settler was James Bradbury Sr., who moved to the area from Williamson County and chose a site along the banks of the South Llano River. Others settled in the Big and Little Saline valleys. Two of the Gentry's sons were later killed, one by Indians and the other during the Civil War. Bradbury was also killed by Indians during what was known as the Battle of Bradbury Hills.

The Texas Legislature enacted legislation on January 22, 1858, creating Kimble County from what was previously part of Bexar County. The new county was named for Lieutenant George C. Kimble (sometimes spelled Kimbell), who died during the Battle of the Alamo. From 1858 to 1875, Kimble County was attached to Gillespie County for judicial purposes.

Meanwhile, several settlements sprang up along the Johnson Fork of the Llano River, near Copperas Creek, and in the valleys of the James River after the Civil War. Throughout the 1870s, the lightly populated settlements of Kimble County faced raids by Comanches, as well as Lipans and Kickapoos, who used Mexico as their base. All raids ceased after 1878. The county also became a popular haven for outlaws who used the area's hilly terrain and dense cedar breaks as hideouts.

On September 6, 1875, Kimble County was separated from Gillespie County and attached to Menard County for judicial purposes.

County organization
Nearly 18 years after its creation, Kimble County was officially organized on January 3, 1876. William Potter was the county's first judge. That spring, the towns of Kimbleville and Denman (quickly changed to Junction City) were founded. Kimbleville was designated the first county seat. During the first district court session, however, the seat was moved to Junction City. Kimbleville soon disappeared largely due to its location in a flood-prone area of the county. Other communities were formed during the latter half of the 19th century, including London, Noxville, Roosevelt, Segovia, Telegraph, and Viejo (later Cleo).

Growth era

The population of Kimble County rose from 72 in 1870 to 1,343 in 1880. In 1878, a courthouse was erected in Junction City. The structure was destroyed, along with all of the county records, in an 1884 fire. The replacement, a two-story stone building, was partially destroyed by fire in 1888, but was repaired and remained in operation until the present courthouse was constructed in 1929. The census of 1890 recorded 2,243 people and 279 farms and ranches in the county. The raising of cattle and sheep soon dominated the economy. In 1894, the county seat of Junction City became known simply as Junction.

Kimble County continued to grow during the early 20th century. The population in 1900 was 2,503. The 20th century brought many amenities to the county that were previously unavailable. Four Mile Dam was completed in 1904. The first telephone system came to Junction in 1905, and the first banks opened a year later. Electric lights came to Junction in 1917 and gas stations were introduced soon after.

A county-wide bond election to fund the construction of gravel and paved roads was approved in 1919. By 1922, State Highway 27 was a working unpaved road. It ran through Junction, southeast to Kerrville, and west to Sonora. State Highways 4 and 29 were also operational. State Highway 29 extended through the communities of London and Telegraph by 1930. Most Kimble County roads had been paved by the late 1940s. Old Highways 4 and 27 became U.S. Highway 83, Highway 27 became U.S. Highway 290, and Highway 29 became U.S. Highway 377.

Junction was officially incorporated in 1927. In the late 1920s, Kimble County had become one of the state's leaders in the wool and mohair industry. Various aspects of agricultural production continued to dominate the local economy, however.

Unemployment increased in the county during the Great Depression, but the population rose throughout the 1930s and stood at 5,064 by the 1940 census. Electricity was introduced to rural Kimble County in April 1945. In the mid-1940s, the economy diversified as a small amount of oil production was introduced, along with the limited production of sand, gravel, and gas.

Modern times
After peaking in 1940, the population began to decline during the postwar period. Kimble County lost 715 people or 15% of its population between 1950 and 1970. A small recovery was registered by 1980 that continued through 2000.

Geography

Major highways
  Interstate 10
  U.S. Highway 83
  U.S. Highway 290
  U.S. Highway 377

Adjacent counties
 Menard County (north)
 Mason County (northeast)
 Gillespie County (east)
 Kerr County (southeast)
 Edwards County (southwest)
 Sutton County (west)
 Schleicher County (northwest)

Demographics

Note: the US Census treats Hispanic/Latino as an ethnic category. This table excludes Latinos from the racial categories and assigns them to a separate category. Hispanics/Latinos can be of any race.

As of the 2000 census, 4,468 people, 1,866 households, and 1,285 families resided in the county. The population density was 4 people per square mile (1/km2).  The 2,996 housing units  averaged 2 per square mile (1/km2). The racial makeup of the county was 90.29% White, 0.09% African American, 0.34% Native American, 0.45% Asian, 0.02% Pacific Islander, 7.48% from other races, and 1.34% from two or more races. About 20.73% of the population was Hispanic or Latino of any race.

Of the 1,866 households, 28.20% had children under the age of 18 living with them, 57.20% were married couples living together, 8.60% had a female householder with no husband present, and 31.10% were not families. Around 28.60% of all households were made up of individuals, and 16.00% had someone living alone who was 65 years of age or older.  The average household size was 2.37 and the average family size was 2.90.

In the county, the population was distributed as 23.60% under the age of 18, 6.00% from 18 to 24, 22.60% from 25 to 44, 26.90% from 45 to 64, and 20.90% who were 65 years of age or older.  The median age was 43 years. For every 100 females, there were 92.70 males.  For every 100 females age 18 and over, there were 90.50 males.

Males had a median income of $24,844 versus $20,431 for females. The per capita income for the county was $17,127. About 13.40% of families and 18.80% of the population were below the poverty line, including 28.80% of those under age 18 and 14.20% of those age 65 or over.

Education
The Junction Independent School District serves most of Kimble County, including the city of Junction and the communities of London, Roosevelt, and Telegraph. The southeastern portion of the county is part of the Harper Independent School District, which is headquartered in the Gillespie County community of Harper. Also, a small portion of the county lies within the Mason Independent School District.

Communities

City
 Junction (county seat)

Unincorporated communities
 London
 Roosevelt

Ghost towns
 Noxville
 Segovia
 Telegraph

Politics
Kimble County is solidly Republican.

See also

 Adelsverein
 German Texan
 List of museums in Central Texas
 National Register of Historic Places listings in Kimble County, Texas
 Recorded Texas Historic Landmarks in Kimble County
 Coke R. Stevenson
 Andrew Murr

References

External links

 

 
1876 establishments in Texas
Populated places established in 1876
Texas Hill Country